Dacalana cremera is a butterfly in the family Lycaenidae. It was described by Lionel de Nicéville in 1894. It is found in the Indomalayan realm.

Subspecies
D. c. cremera (Java)
D. c. ricardi (Eliot, 1959) (Peninsular Malaya)
D. c. capusa (Fruhstorfer, [1912]) (Nias Island)

References

External links
Dacalana Moore, 1884 at Markku Savela's Lepidoptera and Some Other Life Forms 

Dacalana
Butterflies described in 1894